Boldklubben af 1893 is a Danish football club currently playing in the Danish 2nd Division. They play at the 7,000 seat Østerbro Stadion in Østerbro, Copenhagen.

Achievements

 Danish championship titles (9):
 1916, 1927, 1929, 1930, 1934, 1935, 1939, 1942, 1946
 Danish Cup: 1982
 35 seasons in the Highest Danish League
 28 seasons in the Second Highest Danish League
 11 seasons in the Third Highest Danish League

Current squad

External links
 Official site (in Danish)

 
1893 establishments in Denmark
Football clubs in Copenhagen